Shota Kawano (born 16 September 1985) is a Japanese wheelchair tennis player. He represented Japan at the 2012 Summer Paralympics in quad singles and quad doubles and at the 2016 Summer Paralympics in quad singles and quad doubles. His doubles partner both years was Mitsuteru Moroishi. At the 2015 ITF German Open, Kawano won the men's quad singles and quad doubles events.

References

External links 
 

1985 births
Living people
Japanese male tennis players
Wheelchair tennis players
Paralympic wheelchair tennis players of Japan
Wheelchair tennis players at the 2012 Summer Paralympics
Wheelchair tennis players at the 2016 Summer Paralympics
20th-century Japanese people
21st-century Japanese people